California v. Acevedo, 500 U.S. 565 (1991), was a decision of the United States Supreme Court, which interpreted the Carroll doctrine to provide one rule to govern all automobile searches. The Court stated, "The police may search an automobile and the containers within it where they have probable cause to believe contraband or evidence is contained." The decision also overruled the distinctions in United States v. Chadwick (1977) and Arkansas v. Sanders (1979) which had previously held that, if probable cause existed to search an automobile, the police may perform a warrantless search of the automobile and the containers within it, but if the police only had probable cause to search a container in the automobile, the police first had to obtain a warrant before searching the container.

It thereby confirmed Carroll v. United States (1925), which held that a warrantless search of an automobile based upon probable cause to believe that the vehicle contained evidence of crime in the light of an exigency arising out of the vehicle's likely disappearance did not contravene the Fourth Amendment's Warrant Clause.

See also
 List of United States Supreme Court cases, volume 500
 List of United States Supreme Court cases
 Lists of United States Supreme Court cases by volume
 List of United States Supreme Court cases by the Rehnquist Court
Arizona v. Gant, 
United States v. Chadwick, 433 U.S. 1 (1977)
Arkansas v. Sanders, 442 U.S. 753 (1979)

Further reading

External links
 

United States Supreme Court cases
United States Supreme Court cases of the Rehnquist Court
United States Supreme Court decisions that overrule a prior Supreme Court decision
United States Fourth Amendment case law
1991 in United States case law
1991 in California
Legal history of California